Matthew Jackson may refer to:

Matthew Jackson (baseball), American baseball player
Matthew Jackson (EastEnders), a character on the soap opera EastEnders
Matthew Jackson (footballer) (born 1974), former Australian rules footballer
Matthew Day Jackson (born 1974), American artist
Matthew O. Jackson (born 1962), professor of economics
Matt Jackson (footballer) (born 1971), English former footballer
Matt Jackson (Jeopardy! contestant) (born 1992)
Matt Jackson (wrestler) (born 1985), professional wrestler, member of The Young Bucks
Mat Jackson (born 1982), British racing driver